General Computer Corporation (GCC), later GCC Technologies, was an American hardware and software company formed in 1981 by Doug Macrae, John Tylko, and Kevin Curran. The company began as a video game developer and  created the arcade games Ms. Pac-Man (1982) and Food Fight (1983) as well as designing the hardware for the Atari 7800 console and many of its games. In 1984 the company pivoted to developing home computer peripherals, such as the HyperDrive hard drive for the Macintosh 128K, and printers. GCC was disestablished in 2015.

History

Video games
GCC started out making mod-kits for existing arcade games - for example Super Missile Attack, which was sold as an enhancement board to Atari's Missile Command. At first Atari sued, but ultimately dropped the suit and hired GCC to develop games for Atari (and stop making enhancement boards for Atari's games without permission). They created an enhancement kit for Pac-Man called Crazy Otto which they sold to Midway, who in turn sold it as the sequel Ms. Pac-Man; they also developed Jr. Pac-Man, that game's successor.

Under Atari, Inc., GCC made the original arcade games Food Fight, Quantum, and the unreleased Nightmare; developed the Atari 2600 versions of Ms. Pac-Man and Centipede; produced over half of the Atari 5200 cartridges; and developed the chip design for the Atari 7800, plus the first round of cartridges for that system.

Peripherals
In 1984, the company changed direction to make peripherals for Macintosh computers: the HyperDrive (the Mac's first internal hard drive), the WideWriter 360 large format inkjet printer, and the Personal Laser Printer (the first QuickDraw laser printer). Prior to closing, the company focused exclusively on laser printers.

HyperDrive was unusual because the original Macintosh did not have any internal interface for hard disks.  It was attached directly to the CPU, and ran about seven times faster than Apple's "Hard Disk 20", an external hard disk that attached to the floppy disk port.

The HyperDrive was considered an elite upgrade at the time, though it was hobbled by Apple's Macintosh File System, which had been designed to manage 400K floppy disks; as with other early Macintosh hard disks, the user had to segment the drive such that it appeared to be two or more partitions, called Drawers.

The second issue of MacTech Magazine, in January 1985, included a letter that summed up the excitement:

In 1986 the company shipped the "HyperDrive 2000", a 20MB internal hard disk that also included a Motorola 68881 floating-point unit, but the speed advantage of the HyperDrive had been negated on the new Macintosh Plus computers by Apple's inclusion of an external SCSI port.  General Computer responded with the "HyperDrive FX-20" external SCSI hard disk, but drowned in a sea of competitors that offered fast large hard disks.

General Computer changed its name to GCC Technologies and relocated to Burlington, Massachusetts. They continued to sell laser printers until 2015, at which point the company was disestablished.

Employees
 Elizabeth (Betty) Ryan
 Lucy Gilbert

References

External links
GCC corporate homepage
Video: "College Dreams- the story of General Computer" Play Value - ON Networks

Defunct computer companies of the United States
Computer printer companies
Computer peripheral companies
Defunct video game companies of the United States
Video game development companies
Computer companies established in 1981
Computer companies disestablished in 2015
Electronics companies established in 1981
Electronics companies disestablished in 2015